Dindori may refer to:

Madhya Pradesh 
 Dindori, Madhya Pradesh, town and district headquarters in Madhya Pradesh, India
 Dindori district, district of Madhya Pradesh, India
 Dindori (Madhya Pradesh Vidhan Sabha constituency), a constituency in Madhya Pradesh

Maharashtra 
 Dindori, Maharashtra, a town in Nashik district in Maharashtra, India
 Dindori (Lok Sabha constituency), a Lok Sabha constituency in Maharashtra
 Dindori (Maharashtra Vidhan Sabha constituency), an assembly constituency in Maharashtra